is a Japanese alternative idol girl group that was founded in 2015 by their manager Junnosuke Watanabe. The group was conceived as a successor to BiS, an idol group managed by Watanabe that disbanded in 2014. They are set to disband in June 2023.

History 

Bish was initially announced in January 2015 with the idea to begin Bis again, and auditions began that month in order to find members. After the audition process, the completed lineup was announced in March, and members Yukako Love Deluxe, Cent Chihiro Chicchi, Aina the End, Hug Mii, and Momoko Gumi Company were revealed to the public. The members' eyes were obscured with black contact lenses and could not be revealed until they each attained 4,444 followers on Twitter.

Their first song "Spark", from the album Brand-New Idol Shit, was released through the music site Ototoy as a free download: first as a demo version with vocals by their manager, then the finished version was released one week later.  At that time, Yukako Love Deluxe chose to withdraw from the group before their official debut. In an interview with Ototoy, she cited reasons of stress and anxiety in relation to her withdrawal. She had recorded vocals for all tracks on the album, so her parts had to be re-recorded before its release. Her voice was retained, however, on "Spark".

Bish released a music video for the song "Bish - Hoshi ga Matataku Yoru ni" in April. As the release of the album drew closer, Bish began to release more of its songs as free downloads. By 21 May, just six days before its official release date, all 13 of the album tracks were available for free. This did not harm album sales, however, and their first album reached the 20th position on Oricon's Weekly Album Chart.

On 31 May, Bish held their first solo concert, "This Is For Bis", at Nakano Heavy Sick Zero. Though venue's capacity was merely 80 people, it was chosen for its significance, being the venue where BiS' first one-man was held. During the show, the members announced an audition to recruit more members, and a single to be released in September.

In August, Bish performed at the 2015 Tokyo Idol Festival. However, due to their fans and fans of their sister group POP (Period of Plastic 2 Mercy) failing to follow the rules of the festival during the groups' performances, both groups had all events on the second day cancelled. Footage from the festival that was broadcast on TV shows festival staff attempting to bring Bish's performance to a halt in the middle of a song.

On 5 August, two new Bish members were revealed: Lingling and Hashiyasume Atsuko, bringing the total number of members up to six. Just as the earlier members of the group, their profile photos were taken with black contact lenses. Their true faces could not be revealed until they gained more Twitter followers than Bish manager Junnosuke Watanabe. However, Watanabe got bored of waiting and lowered the number to 5000 followers for both members, and their faces were revealed later that week.

On 14 August 2015, Bish revealed the music video for their first single, the Celtic metal song "OTNK", featuring the new members.  On 2 October 2015 it was announced that Bish would release a second album with the title Full Metal Jacket. This was later changed to Fake Metal Jacket, and was released on 20 January 2016. Fake Metal Jacket was promoted with a music video for the song "Monsters", which originally appeared on their first album. Upon release, the album reached 5th place on the daily Oricon album charts.

On 19 January 2016, Bish announced at the final leg of their "Idol Is Shit" tour that they would have their major debut through the label Avex Trax in May 2016.

The group released the hardcore punk song "Deadman" as their major-label debut single on 5 May, billing the 99-second number as "(Probably) the shortest major debut song ever?!" The coupling track "earth" was composed by Tetsuya Komuro and the release was mastered by Tim Young. "Deadman" reached 5th position on the Oricon weekly singles chart, and shortly after its release, Bish announced the release of their major-label debut album in October 2016.

On 16 May 2016, member Hug Mii announced her withdrawal from Bish, citing family reasons as the cause. Her last performance was on 2 June.

On 1 August 2016, new member Ayuni D was revealed to the public. She made her debut with the group at the "TOKYO BiSH SHiNE repetition" event on 24 August, where they announced the title of their upcoming October album, Killer Bish.

Aina the End, the lead vocalist of the group, underwent surgery for vocal polyps at the end of 2016, which meant the group ended their activities for the year with the free concert "In The End". She returned in 2017, and Bish announced their single "Promise the Star" would be released later in the year.

Bish released their first mini-album, Giant Killers, on 28 June, featuring title track "Giant Killers" and "Shakai no Rule", the theme song for cartoon Heybot!, with lyrics written by Hashiyasume Atsuko. Certain editions of the album contain "Introducing Bish", a twelve-track compilation CD featuring new recordings of past Bish songs featuring vocals by Ayuni D.

On 4 November 2017, Bish had a surprise release of their second major-label album, The Guerrilla Bish, exclusively through Tower Records. The album was released at a price of ¥299 without any prior advertising, and the surprise edition is packaged without cover art or a lyrics booklet, a reference to Kanye West's sixth album Yeezus. The music video for the lead song "My landscape" was filmed at the Mojave Air and Space Port's airplane graveyard in California, as was the photography for the album cover.

On 28 March 2018, Bish released the single "Paint It Black". The song was used as the second opening theme for the anime series Black Clover.

On 3 July 2019, Bish released the single "More Than Like", which was used as the fourth and final opening theme of Fairy Tail'''s final season.

On 22 July 2020, the album Letters was released, considered the band's "major 3.5th" album, containing 7 tracks.

On 4 August 2021, the album Going to Destruction'' was released.

On 24 December 2021, Bish announced that they will disband in 2023.

In 2022, Bish released a new single every month, starting with "Final Shits" and ending with "Zutto".

On 8 February 2023, Bish announced that they had established Bish Co., Ltd. and audition project Bish The Next, with the purpose of producing their successor group.

Bish's final single, "Bye-Bye Show", will be released on March 22.

Bish are set to disband on 29 June 2023, at their final concert which will be held at Tokyo Dome.

Members

Current
Aina the End (アイナ・ジ・エンド)
Cent Chihiro Chicchi (セントチヒロ・チッチ)
Momoko Gumi Company (モモコグミカンパニー )
Lingling (リンリン)
Hashiyasume Atsuko (ハシヤスメ・アツコ)
Ayuni D (アユニ・D)

Former
Yukako Love Deluxe (ユカコラブデラックス)
Hug Mii (ハグ・ミィ)

Timeline

Discography

Studio albums

Compilation albums

Live albums

Extended plays

Singles

As lead artist

Collaborations

Other appearances

Videography

Live albums

Documentary albums

Awards and nominations

References 

Japanese pop music groups
Musical groups established in 2015
Musical groups from Tokyo
Japanese idol groups
2015 establishments in Japan
Ironman Heavymetalweight Champions
Musical groups disestablished in 2023